Sant'Agata may refer to:

People
 Agatha of Sicily, an Italian Christian Saint

Places of Italy
Municipalities (comuni)
 Sant'Agata Bolognese, in the Province of Bologna
 Sant'Agata de' Goti, in the Province of Benevento
 Sant'Agata del Bianco, in the Province of Reggio Calabria
 Sant'Agata di Esaro, in the Province of Cosenza
 Sant'Agata di Militello, in the Province of Messina
 Sant'Agata di Puglia, in the Province of Foggia
 Sant'Agata Fossili, in the Province of Alessandria
 Sant'Agata Feltria, in the Province of Rimini
 Sant'Agata li Battiati, in the Province of Catania
 Sant'Agata sul Santerno, in the Province of Ravenna
 Tovo di Sant'Agata, in the Province of Sondrio

Civil parishes (frazioni)
 Sant'Agata, in the municipality of Villanova sull'Arda (PC); seat of the Villa Verdi
 Sant'Agata Irpina, in the municipality of Solofra (AV)
 Sant'Agata Martesana, in the municipality of Cassina de' Pecchi (MI)
 Sant'Agata sui Due Golfi, frazione di Massa Lubrense (NA)

Religious buildings
 Sant'Agata Cathedral, the cathedral of Catania
 Sant'Agata Chapel, a chapel of Pisa
 Sant'Agata dei Goti, a church of Rome
 Sant'Agata, Brescia 
 Sant'Agata, Cremona

See also
Sainte-Agathe (disambiguation)